Kate Harrisson is a British diplomat. She is the British Ambassador to Peru.

Career 
She graduated from Open University, and SOAS University of London. She gained first degrees in Modern Chinese studies and in psychology and she has a master's degree in social anthropology. She worked in business in China until in 2000 she decided to join the Foreign and Commonwealth Office.

She was Deputy Head of Mission to Vietnam, Political Counselor in China, and Economic Consul in Hong Kong. She was a panelist at 2019 Latin American Cities Conferences: Lima.

She signed a Infrastructure Task Force Memorandum of Understanding in 2021 to continue to support a joint Infrastructure Task Force that had been working since 2018. She promoted infrastructure improvement in Peru.

References 

Ambassadors of the United Kingdom to Peru
British women ambassadors
Living people
Year of birth missing (living people)
Alumni of the Open University
Alumni of SOAS University of London